The 2009 Girabola was the 31st season of top-tier football in Angola. The season ran from 21 February to 25 October 2009. Petro Atlético were the defending champions.

The league comprised 14 teams and the bottom three were relegated to the 2010 Gira Angola.

Petro Atlético de Luanda were crowned champions,  while Académica do Lobito, Primeiro de Maio and Kabuscorp were relegated. David Magalhães of Petro Luanda finished as top scorer with 19 goals.

Changes from 2008 season
Relegated: Benfica do Lubango, Petro do Huambo, Sagrada Esperança 
Promoted: Académica do Lobito, Académica do Soyo, Recreativo da Caála

League table

Results

Season statistics

Top scorers

Pokers & Hat-tricks

References

External links
Girabola 2009 standings at zerozero.pt
Girabola 2009 stats at jornaldosdesportos.sapo.ao
Girabola 2009 standings at girabola.com
Federação Angolana de Futebol

2009 in Angolan football
Girabola seasons
Angola
Angola